The Green Party (SZ) leadership election of 2009 was held on 5 December 2009. Ondřej Liška defeated Matěj Stropnický and became the new Leader.

Background
Martin Bursík resigned on the position of leader after debacle in 2009 European election. Ondřej Liška became acting leader. Election was set for December 2009. Liška decided to run for the position of the Leader. Matěj Stropnický became his main rival.

Voting
There were 4 Candidates - Ondřej Liška, Matěj Stropnický, Josef Jadrný and Jan Linhart. Jadrný withdrawn from election before the election. Liška then defeated both Stropnický and Linhart.

References

Green Party (Czech Republic) leadership elections
Green Party leadership election
Green Party (Czech Republic) leadership election
Indirect elections
Green Party (Czech Republic) leadership election